Markus Kemmelmeier is a German social psychologist at the University of Nevada, Reno, where he is a foundation professor and director of the Ph.D. program in interdisciplinary social psychology.

Career 
He is known for his research on the psychological effects of exposure to flags, such as the American flag. He has also researched the relationship between political ideology and intelligence.

References

External links
Faculty page
Profile at Social Psychology Network

Living people
American social psychologists
University of Mannheim alumni
University of Michigan alumni
American political psychologists
Year of birth missing (living people)